The Polynesian Society is a non-profit organisation based at the University of Auckland, New Zealand, dedicated to the scholarly study of the history, ethnography, and mythology of Oceania.

History

The society was co-founded in 1892 by Percy Smith and Edward Tregear, largely in response to a conviction, widely held at the time, that the Māori and other Polynesian peoples were a dying race. Smith and his friends hoped that it would help to preserve the traditional lore of the Māori before it disappeared and provide scholars with a forum for learned discussion of their ethnographic research (Byrnes 2006).

The initial membership of the society was 112, which had grown to 1,300 by 1965. Presidents have included bishops H. W. and W. L. Williams; James Pope, Edward Tregear, Percy Smith, Elsdon Best, William Skinner, Sir Āpirana Ngata, Harry Skinner, J. M. McEwen, Professor Sir Hugh Kawharu and Dame Joan Metge. The present president is Dr Richard Benton.

Until her death in 2006, the society's patron was the Māori Queen Te Arikinui Dame Te Ata-i-rangi-kaahu (1931–2006); Dame Te Ata was succeeded by the current patrons, Le Afioga Tuiatua Tupua Tamasese Efi, Head of State of Samoa, and Te Ariki Tumu Te Heuheu, Paramount Chief of Ngati Tuwharetoa.

Publications
From its earliest days, the society published the quarterly Journal of the Polynesian Society, which became the society's principal means to publish information about the indigenous peoples of Polynesia, Melanesia, and Micronesia. The journal is a rich repository of the traditions of Oceania. Its first editors were S. Percy Smith and Edward Tregear. Smith was its chief contributor until his death in 1922.  The list of subsequent editors includes W. H. Skinner, Elsdon Best, Johannes C. Andersen, H. D. Skinner, C. R. H. Taylor, W. R. Geddes, W. C. Groves, Bruce Biggs, Melvyn McLean and Richard Moyle. The present editors are Judith Huntsman and Melinda Allen.

In addition to this journal, the society has published many notable monographs, including  S. Percy Smith's History and Traditions of the Taranaki Coast (1910) and The Lore of the Whare Wananga (1913–15); A. Shand's The Moriori  People of the Chatham Islands (1911); Elsdon Best, The Maori (1924) and Tuhoe (1925); J. C. Andersen, Maori Music (1934); and C. R. H. Taylor, A Pacific Bibliography (1951), and two catalogues of the Oldman Collection of Māori and Polynesian artifacts (2004).

Other major works include A. Ngata and Pei Te Hurinui Jones Nga Moteatea (1959–1990), a definitive four-volume collection of traditional Māori song with translations and commentaries, which has been published in a new, enhanced edition by Auckland University Press in association with the Polynesian Society.

A history of the society and its journal, M. P. K. Sorrenson's Manifest Duty: The Polynesian Society over 100 years, and a Centennial Index 1892–1991 (D. Brown, compiler) were published in 1991.

See also
Société des océanistes

References
Brown, Dorothy (compiler), Centennial Index 1892–1991. Memoir No. 50. Auckland, The Polynesian Society.

Sorrenson, M.P.K., "Manifest Duty: The Polynesians Society over 100 Years". Memoir No. 49. Auckland, The Polynesian Society.
Encyclopedia of New Zealand

External links
The Polynesian Society website
Journal of the Polynesian Society – online issues

Learned societies of New Zealand
University of Auckland
Historical societies
Polynesian mythology
Polynesian culture
Polynesian-New Zealand culture in Auckland
Oceanian-New Zealand culture in Auckland
1892 establishments in New Zealand
Organizations established in 1892
History organisations based in New Zealand